Clivina boops is a species of ground beetle in the subfamily Scaritinae. It was described by Blackburn in 1890.

References

boops
Beetles described in 1890